KVVO-LP (94.1 FM; "Inspirational Country Radio") is a radio station located in Abilene, Texas, broadcasting a Christian country music format. Inspirational Country Radio is owned by licensee Wildfire Global Church.

Programming
The station broadcasts a mix of Christian country, faith-driven songs by mainstream country artists, southern gospel, and classic country. Specialty shows include The Bluegrass Gospel Hour, Country for the Good Life with Texas-based host Tommy Smith, and Sunday Side Up with Ray Sargent. The station broadcasts sermons from Bethel Assembly in Anson, Texas, on a one-week delay.

All staff at Inspirational Country Radio donate their time on-air to the ministry.

External links
 KVVO official website
 

VVO-LP
VVO-LP
VVO-LP
Radio stations established in 2005
2005 establishments in Texas